A number of members of the Leake family were prominent and notable individuals in the Swan River Colony and the history of Perth, Western Australia – and the History of Western Australia.

Members of the family were included in the "six hungry families" who inter-married and sustained a significant political power in nineteenth century Perth.

Tree

List
Luke m. Miss Glover
 Lucas (1682 Sudbury − 1749 Willisham) m. Elizabeth Brownrigg
 George (1726–1771 Lothbury, London) m. Alice Webster (−1787)
 Luke (1756 Lothbury-1799 Aldersgate, London) m. Ann Heading or Hidden (1758 Cliddersden-1836 Perth, WA)
 Luke (1784 High Wycombe −1838 Perth, WA) m. Mary-Ann Walpole (1801–1872)
John (1827–1850 in California)
 Sir Luke Samuel Leake (1828–1886) m. Louisa Walpole
 George Walpole Leake (1825–1895) m1. Rose Ellen Gliddon m2. (1893) Amy Mabel May
 George Leake (1856–1902) m. Louisa Emily Burt, daughter of Sir Archibald Burt
 George Leake (1785–1849) m.1 Anne Growse m.2
 John (1795–1850 in Adelaide)
 Catherine

Notes

References
Erickson, Rica. Dictionary of Western Australians 1829–1914 – various entries

Further reading
 Adam, Jane E. (née Leake), (d 1951) (1949).Reminiscences of early days in Perth ...completed in 1949 when she was in her 85th year. Typescript held in Battye Library. – library catalogue description has the social conditions, buildings, personalities of Perth in her childhood in 1870s and as seen on visits in 1929 and later. Includes Leake family history from 1830–.
 Chapman, Jenny.(1965) Perserverando : the Leake family in the political, economic and social life of W.A., 1829–1902, with particular reference to George Leake (1786–1849), Sir Luke Samuel Leake (1828–1886), and George Leake (1856–1902) held in Battye Library.

Family papers
 Leake family. Papers, 1824–1904 [manuscript] Battye Library, MN 392, Leake family papers, ACC 871A, ACC 1955A, 4102A, 4441A, 4702A. Library catalogue part description of papers: George Walpole Leake (1825–1895) came to Western Australia on the "Cygnet" in 1833; became land owner in the Swan district, Crown Solicitor, Acting Attorney-General, 1874–1875. His son George (1856–1902) was called to the Bar in 1880, becoming in turn Crown Solicitor, Public Prosecutor, Q.C., M.L.C. for Albany (1894–1900), then West Perth (1901–1902). Delegate to Australasian Federal Convention of 1897–1898. Premier of W.A. 1901–1902. Detailed listing available (MN 392)

Leake
History of Western Australia